NPO Politiek en Nieuws is a public television channel operated by the public broadcaster NOS, which supplies news and sports to all national public television and radio networks. Programmes come live from The Hague when the parliament is in session. When the parliament was not in session the NPO Politiek en Nieuws channel became NPO Sport, broadcasting sporting events or news and current affairs, supplied by the NOS. On 15 December 2021, NPO Nieuws merged with NPO Politiek to make the present name of this channel. Before 10 March 2014 the channel was called Politiek 24.

NPO Sport 

Especially in the summer months, the channel reported on sporting events which were not fully shown on the open channels of the NPO. These competitions included the World Cup/European Athletics Championships, World Cup/European Swimming Championships, World Equestrian Games, World Championships and Vuelta a España.

References

External links 

 Official Website NPO Politiek en Nieuws

Television channels in the Netherlands
Television channels and stations established in 2006